Iker Benito Sánchez (born 10 August 2002) is a Spanish footballer who plays as a right winger for CA Osasuna.

Club career
Born in Miranda de Ebro, Burgos, Castile and León, Benito joined CA Osasuna's youth setup in 2018, after a period on trial at Athletic Bilbao, from CD Pamplona. On 13 May of the following year, he signed a two-year professional contract with the former club, with an option for a further two campaigns.

Benito was promoted to the reserves in May 2020, and made his senior debut on 25 October, coming on as a second-half substitute in a 0–2 Segunda División B away loss against CD Tudelano. He scored his first senior goal on 25 September 2021, netting the B's second in a 2–0 away win over AD San Juan in the Segunda División RFEF championship.

Benito made his first team – and La Liga – debut on 19 January 2022, replacing fellow youth graduate Kike Barja late into a 0–2 loss at RC Celta de Vigo.

References

External links

2002 births
Living people
People from Miranda de Ebro
Sportspeople from the Province of Burgos
Spanish footballers
Footballers from Castile and León
Association football wingers
La Liga players
Primera Federación players
Segunda División B players
Segunda Federación players
CA Osasuna B players
CA Osasuna players